"Flower Way", also known as "Flower Road", is a song by South Korean singer Sejeong released on November 22, 2016, by Jellyfish Entertainment and distributed by Stone Music Entertainment. The track was a promotional tool for Jellyfish Entertainment's digital music platform Jelly Box. "Flower Way" was placed first on the music show Show Champion on November 30, 2016.

Background 
"Flower Way" was initially born as an improvisation by Zico, who created the song in less than hour on the television show Talents for Sale, in which celebrities cooperate to raise funds for local charities by advertising products created based on their talents. It was first performed by Sejeong and her band-mate Jung Chae-yeon on the same show. On November 16, 2016, it was announced that Sejeong was working on finishing the song alongside Zico and would release it, alongside a music video, on November 23 through Jellyfish Entertainment's music channel project Jelly Box.

Composition 
"Flower Way" was written and produced by South Korean rapper Zico, who was inspired to create the song after hearing a letter written by Sejeong, directed to her mother. From this letter were the lyrics of the song derived. The letter expressed Sejeong’s regret towards and appreciation for her mother, as well as a promise to bring her a better future.

Commercial performance 
"Flower Way" peaked at number two on the Gaon Digital Chart.

Promotion 
Sejeong had been promoting the track through a variety of music program appearances. She made her debut showcase on KBS' Music Bank on November 25.

Track listing

Charts

Accolades

Release history

References

Kim Se-jeong songs
2016 songs
Korean-language songs
2016 singles
Jellyfish Entertainment singles